Dune water is drinking water which has been pumped up from the dunes. Fresh rainwater filters through the sandy dunes and floats on top of the salt water from where it can be pumped up, purified, and used as fresh drinking water.

Europe

Netherlands 
In 1851 a dune water company, Amsterdamsche Duinwater-Maatschappij, was founded in Amsterdam. This was the very first tap water company in the Netherlands. Since 1953 water was pumped from the dunes and transported to Amsterdam through a pipeline. Pumping up the fresh water from the dunes caused the ground water level to drop so in 1957 it was decided that river water had to infiltrated to replenish the supply. After the sand filtered the river water, it was pumped up and purified for human consumption. This Dutch process is unique in the world.
Since 1975 the water is purified before infiltration. By using ozonisation and charcoal the Dutch purify their water without using chlorine. Tap water in the Netherlands is considered to be amongst the highest quality municipal waters in the world.

Dune water is used as drinking water in most of the coastal areas in the Netherlands.

See also 

 EU water policy

References

External sources 
 The dune water machine

Dunes
Drinking water
Water supply and sanitation in the Netherlands

nl:Duinwater